Joan Muriel Upton (16 December 1922 – 18 December 2016) was a British hurdler. She competed in the women's 80 metres hurdles at the 1948 Summer Olympics.

References

External links

1922 births
2016 deaths
Athletes (track and field) at the 1948 Summer Olympics
British female hurdlers
Olympic athletes of Great Britain